Umm al-Surab (also Umm es-Surab, Umm al-Sarab) is a residential area located in the Northwestern Badia District, Mafraq Governorate, Jordan. The region belongs to the northwestern Badia district, which includes 15 districts. Its population is estimated at 4,130 people, according to the 2015 census.

Archaeology
The ruins of a rural Byzantine-period monastery complete with agricultural facilities were described at Umm es-Surab.

References

Mafraq Governorate
Populated places in Mafraq Governorate